Pinus hwangshanensis, or Huangshan pine, is a pine endemic to the mountains of eastern China; it is named after the Huangshan Mountains in Anhui, from where it was first described.

Description
Pinus hwangshanensis is an evergreen tree reaching  in height, with a very broad, flat-topped crown of long, level branches. The bark is thick, grayish, and scaly plated. Pollination occurs in mid-spring, with the cones maturing 18–20 months after.

It is closely related to Japanese black pine (P. thunbergii), differing from it in the slenderer leaves, brown (not white) buds and broader cones.

Distribution and habitat 
Huangshan pines are endemic to the mountains of eastern China, in the provinces of Anhui, Fujian, Guizhou, Hubei, Hunan, Jiangxi, and Zhejiang.

They typically grow at moderate to high altitudes on steep, rocky crags, and are a major vegetation component in the landscapes of eastern China. Many specimens are venerated for their unique rugged shapes and are frequently portrayed in traditional Chinese paintings.

References

External links

Gymnosperm Database: Pinus hwangshanensis
Huangshan pine on Huang Shan (photos)

Endemic flora of China
Hwangshanensis
Trees of China